Oklahoma Jim is a 1931 American Western film directed by Harry L. Fraser and written by George Arthur Durlam and Harry L. Fraser. The film stars Bill Cody, Andy Shuford, Marion Burns, William Desmond, Franklyn Farnum and John Elliott. The film was released on October 10, 1931, by Monogram Pictures.

Cast           
Bill Cody as Oklahoma Jim Kirby
Andy Shuford as Jerry 
Marion Burns as Betty Rankin
William Desmond as Lacy
Franklyn Farnum as Army Captain
John Elliott as Indian Agent
Ed Brady as Cash Riley
Earl Dwire as Cavalry Sergeant

References

External links
 

1931 films
1930s English-language films
American Western (genre) films
1931 Western (genre) films
Monogram Pictures films
Films directed by Harry L. Fraser
American black-and-white films
1930s American films